Ontario Highway 3A may refer to:

the former section of Ontario Highway 3 between Chambers Corners and Niagara Falls 
the former designation of Ontario Highway 3B in Windsor 

Former Ontario provincial highways